Noble János Bud de Budfalva (30 May 1880 - 7 August 1950) was a Hungarian politician, who served as Minister of Finance between 1924 and 1928. After finishing his law studies he worked for the National Statistical Office. From 1910 he served as secretary aide for the Ministry of Trade. He taught statistic on the University of Budapest. István Bethlen appointed him Minister of Food in 1922. After 1928 he served as Minister of Economic and Minister of Trade. His financial politics the consolidation was in the service of a landowner tycoon's interests.

References
 Magyar Életrajzi Lexikon

1880 births
1950 deaths
People from Dragomirești, Maramureș
People from the Kingdom of Hungary
Finance ministers of Hungary